Mohnnudeln (meaning poppy seed noodles in German), is the name of thick noodles of a potato dough in Bohemian and Austrian cuisine, similar to the Schupfnudel. The main difference is, that Mohnnudeln are served with melted butter, ground poppy seeds, and sprinkled with confectioner's sugar.

They are also called Waldviertler Mohnnudeln, referring to the Austrian area where they originated. Waldviertel is a part of Lower Austria where poppy seeds have been cultivated for ages, which give the dish its distinct black coloring.

Mohnnudeln can be eaten as a dessert or a light supper. Most Bavarians and Austrians serve it traditionally as a main course anyway.

References
 Susanne Seethaler, Die echte bayerische Küche. Traditional Bavarian Cooking (2005)  (p. 103)

External links
 Seitan is my motor: Mohnnudeln - Poppy Seed Noodles

German cuisine
Baden cuisine
Bavarian cuisine
Swabian cuisine
Austrian cuisine
Dumplings
Noodles